The 1918 Alabama gubernatorial election took place on November 2, 1918, to elect the governor of Alabama. Democratic incumbent Charles Henderson was term-limited, and could not seek a second consecutive term.

Results

References

1918
gubernatorial
Alabama
November 1918 events